Serampore (previously known as Serampore-26 and changed to Srerampur-27 in the 2009 election) is one of the 543 Lok Sabha (parliamentary) constituencies in India. The constituency centres on Serampore in West Bengal. Five assembly segments of the constituency are in Hooghly district and two are in Howrah district.

Overview

Srerampur is basically an industrial constituency with an agricultural hinterland. The Howrah-Hooghly industrial belt on the west bank of the Hooghly river covers the Howrah, Hooghly and Srerampur constituency.

According to The Hindu, Serampore and Howrah constituencies have more than 25% non-Bengali voters with their roots in Rajasthan, Bihar or Uttar Pradesh.

Vidhan Sabha segments
As per order of the Delimitation Commission issued in 2006 in respect of the delimitation of constituencies in the West Bengal, parliamentary constituency no. 27 Sreerampur is composed of the following segments:

Prior to delimitation Serampore Lok Sabha constituency was composed of the following assembly segments:Jagatballavpur (assembly constituency no. 167), Panchla (assembly constituency no. 168), Jangipara (assembly constituency no. 177), Chanditala (assembly constituency no. 178), Uttarpara (assembly constituency no. 179), Sreerampur(assembly constituency no. 180), Champdani (assembly constituency no. 181)

Members of Lok Sabha

Runner-up Info 1951-2019
Most of the contests were multi-cornered. However, only winners and runners-up are mentioned below:

Election results

General election 2019

General election 2014

General election 2009

General election 2004

General election 1999

General election 1998

General election 1996

General election 1991

General election 1989

General election 1984

By-election 1981 
A by-election was held in this constituency in 1981 which was necessitated by the Death of sitting MP Dinen Bhattacharya.In the by-election, Ajit Bag of CPIM defeated his nearest rival S.M Roy of Congress by 96,549 votes.

General election 1980

See also
 List of Constituencies of the Lok Sabha

References

External links
Sreerampur lok sabha  constituency election 2019 result details

Lok Sabha constituencies in West Bengal
Politics of Hooghly district